Arthur Beatrice are an English indie rock band, formed in 2010. Its members are Orlando Leopard (lead vocals, guitar, keyboards, organ), Ella Girardot (lead vocals, keyboards, organ) and brothers Elliot (drums, backing vocals) and Hamish Barnes (bass, backing vocals). They were The Guardian 'New Band of the Day - No. 1132 on Friday 21 October 2011.

Arthur Beatrice deliberately avoided music press attention early in its career. The group launched its first single through word of mouth and social media (for example third party blogging) rather than through more public strategies.

Musical style
Several critics have compared them to The xx, The Sundays and The Turtles, however their style is difficult to define.

Discography

Albums
 2014: Working Out
 2016: Keeping The Peace

EPs
 2013: Carter

Singles
 2012: "Midland"
 2014: "More Scrapes" (Peak in FRANCE: #105)
 2015: "Who Returned"
 2016: "Real Life"

References

External links
 Arthur Beatrice in session on the Rob da Bank show

Musical groups established in 2010
English indie rock groups
2010 establishments in England